Tři kamarádi  is a 1947 Czechoslovak film based on the novel Drei Kameraden by Erich Maria Remarque. The film starred Josef Kemr.

References

External links
 

1947 films
1940s Czech-language films
Czechoslovak black-and-white films
Czechoslovak comedy films
1947 comedy films
1940s Czech films